Limnocythere bradburyi is a species of crustacean belonging to the family Limnocytheridae.

It is native to Northern America.

References

Limnocytheridae